Daniel Thomas Pirillo (born October 15, 1985) is an American college baseball coach and former utility player. He is head baseball coach at Long Island University. He played college baseball for the LIU Brooklyn Blackbirds from 2005 to 2008 under head coach Don Maines.

Head coaching record

See also
 List of current NCAA Division I baseball coaches

References

1985 births
Living people
Baseball second basemen
LIU Brooklyn Blackbirds baseball coaches
LIU Brooklyn Blackbirds baseball players
Georgia College Bobcats baseball coaches
Chicago State Cougars baseball coaches
People from Marlboro, New York
LIU Sharks baseball coaches